Disney+ is an American subscription video on-demand over-the-top streaming service owned and operated by the Disney Entertainment division of The Walt Disney Company. The service primarily distributes films and television series produced by The Walt Disney Studios and Walt Disney Television, with dedicated content hubs for the brands Disney, Pixar, Marvel, Star Wars, and National Geographic, as well as Star in some regions. Original films and television series are also distributed on Disney+.

Disney+ relies on technology developed by Disney Streaming Services, which was originally established as BAMTech in 2015 when it was spun off from MLB Advanced Media (MLBAM). Disney increased its ownership share of BAMTech to a controlling stake in 2017, and subsequently transferred ownership to DTCI, as part of a corporate restructuring in anticipation of Disney's acquisition of 21st Century Fox.

With BAMTech helping to launch ESPN+ in early 2018, and Disney's streaming distribution deal with Netflix ending in 2019, Disney took the opportunity to use technologies being developed for ESPN+ to establish a Disney-branded streaming service that would feature its content. Production of films and television shows for exclusive release on the platform began in late 2017.

Disney+ was launched on November 12, 2019, in the United States, Canada, and the Netherlands, and expanded to Australia, New Zealand, and Puerto Rico a week later. It became available in select European countries in March 2020 and in India in April through Star India's Hotstar streaming service, which was rebranded as Disney+ Hotstar. Additional European countries received Disney+ in September 2020, with the service expanding to Latin America in November 2020. It later expanded in Southeast Asian countries since 2021, followed by countries in Northern and Eastern Europe, Middle East and parts of Africa since May 2022.

Upon launch, it was met with positive reception of its content library, but was criticized for technical problems and missing content. Alterations made to films and television shows also attracted media attention. Ten million users had subscribed to Disney+ by the end of its first day of operation. The service has 161.8 million global subscribers .

History

2015–2019 
In late 2015, Disney launched a streaming service in the United Kingdom called DisneyLife to test the streaming market. It was eventually replaced by Disney+ on March 24, 2020.

In August 2016, Disney acquired a minority stake in BAMTech (a spin-off of MLB Advanced Media's streaming technology business) for $1 billion, with an option to acquire a majority stake in the future. Following the purchase, ESPN announced plans for an "exploratory [over-the-top] project" based on its technology (ESPN+) to supplant its existing linear television services. On August 8, 2017, Disney invoked its option to acquire a controlling stake in BAMTech for $1.58 billion, increasing its stake to 75%. Alongside the acquisition, the company also announced plans for a second, Disney-branded direct-to-consumer service drawing from its entertainment content, which would launch after the company ends its existing distribution agreement with Netflix in 2019. Not long after, Agnes Chu, story and franchise development executive at Walt Disney Imagineering, was the first executive appointed for the unit, as senior vice president of content. Chu led two projects to launch the new unit. First, Disney needed to verify exactly what content could be physically and legally made available through a streaming service right away, which meant physically reviewing all content in Disney's vaults that had not recently undergone restoration, and reviewing "binders of pieces of paper with legal deals" to identify potential obstacles. Second, Chu met with leaders of Disney's various content-producing divisions to start brainstorming which projects would be appropriate for release on a streaming service rather than in movie theaters. Chu later left in August 2020.

In December 2017, Disney announced its intent to acquire key entertainment assets from 21st Century Fox. Intended to bolster Disney's content portfolio for its streaming products, the acquisition was completed on March 20, 2019.

In January 2018, it was reported that former Apple and Samsung executive Kevin Swint had been appointed as the senior vice president and general manager reporting to BAMTech CEO Michael Paull, who leads development. In March 2018, Disney's top level segment division was reorganized with the formation of Disney Direct-to-Consumer and International, which then included BAMTech, which contains "all consumer-facing tech and products". In June of the same year, longtime Disney studio marketing chief, Ricky Strauss, was named president of content and marketing, however reporting to chairman of Disney Direct-to-Consumer and International Kevin Mayer. In January 2019, Fox Television Group COO Joe Earley was named executive vice president of marketing and operations. In June 2019, Matt Brodlie was named as senior vice president of international content development. In August 2019, Luke Bradley-Jones was hired as senior vice president of direct to consumer and general manager of Disney+ for Europe and Africa.

On November 8, 2018, Disney CEO Bob Iger announced that the service would be named Disney+ and that the company was targeting a launch in late 2019. A September launch was reportedly planned, but on April 11, 2019, Disney announced that Disney+ would launch on November 12, 2019, in the United States. Disney stated that it planned to roll the service out worldwide over the next two years, targeting Western Europe and Asia-Pacific countries by late 2019 and early 2020, and Eastern Europe and Latin America during 2020. The timing of international launches is subject to the acquisition or expiration of existing streaming rights deals for Disney content. On August 6, 2019, Iger announced that it would offer a streaming bundle of Disney+, ESPN+, and the ad-supported version of Hulu for $12.99 per month available at launch. At the D23 Expo in August 2019, Disney opened subscriptions to Disney+ at a discounted rate for three years.

On September 12, 2019, a trial version of Disney+ became available in the Netherlands with limited content available. This testing phase lasted until the official launch on November 12, when trial users were switched to a paid plan. Disney+ became available for pre-order in September in the United States with a 7-day free trial upon launch.

In October 2019, Disney released a video that ran for three hours and eighteen minutes on YouTube to showcase their launch lineup. It was also reported that Disney would ban advertisements for competitor Netflix from most of its TV platforms, except ESPN.

Disney+ launched on November 12, 2019, Midnight Pacific Time in the announced initial three launch countries. The services had some issues the first day from logging in (about 33% of the problems), accessing specific content (about 66%), setting up profiles and watch lists. Some of the issues were due to third party devices.

On November 18, 2019, an investigation by ZDNet discovered that thousands of users' accounts were hacked using keystroke logging or info-stealing malware. Their email addresses and passwords were changed, "effectively taking over the account and locking the previous owner out", and their login information was put up for sale on the dark web.

2020s 
On March 12, 2020, Vanessa Morrison, who previously served as President of Fox Family and 20th Century Animation, was appointed President of Streaming for Walt Disney Studios Motion Picture Production and currently oversees the development and production of Disney+ film content from The Walt Disney Studios for both Disney Live Action and 20th Century Studios. Morrison reports directly to President of Walt Disney Pictures Sean Bailey.

On October 12, 2020, Disney announced a reorganization of their media business with a greater focus on streaming. They are planning to add more content for Disney+ and their other streaming platforms (such as Hulu) in the future.

On December 10, 2020, Disney announced that a year after the launch of Disney+, it had over 86.8 million subscribers. It was later announced that as of January 2, 2021, the platform had over 94.9 million subscribers. In January of the same year, Ricky Strauss, who led the service's content curation and marketing efforts, left the company.

In March 2021, Disney announced an increase to the streaming service's pricing that would take place on March 26, 2021. In the second quarter of 2021, Disney+ added 8.7 million subscribers.

In August 2021, Disney CEO Bob Chapek suggested that eventually, Disney+ could be merged with Hulu (as in other markets), citing that the bundled approach had less subscriber churn than the individual services alone, but that "there may also be certain constraints that we're under that could at least, from a short-term standpoint, limit our ability to do what long term we might feel was ideal, but frankly we don't know what’s ideal yet."

On March 4, 2022, Disney announced they will plan to launch a low-cost ad-supported version of Disney+ by late 2022 in the United States, with that version also expanding to other international territories in 2023. Disney later announced on August 10, 2022, that the ad-supported version of Disney+ launches on December 8, with more than 100 advertisers. Costing US$7.99 per month, with the ad free version of Disney+ receiving a price hike of US$3.

In May 2022, the company reported it gained 7.9 million subscribers over the first three months of 2022. In August 2022, it was announced that the combined total of subscribers across all Disney streaming platforms including Disney+, Hulu and ESPN+ had surpassed Netflix with roughly 221 million.

In February 2023, Disney reported a total of 161.8 million Disney+ subscribers worldwide at the end of 2022, with a gain of 200,000 in Canada and the United States, but a net loss of 2.4 million worldwide attributed to the loss of streaming rights to Indian Premier League cricket in India.

Content 

The service is built around content from Disney's main entertainment studios and film and television library, including Walt Disney Pictures, Walt Disney Animation Studios, Disneynature, Disneytoon Studios, Pixar, Marvel Studios, Lucasfilm, National Geographic, 20th Century Studios, Searchlight Pictures, Touchstone Pictures, 20th Century Animation, the former Saban Entertainment, Blue Sky Studios and Hollywood Pictures. The service operates alongside Hulu, which Disney gained a controlling stake in following the 21st Century Fox purchase. Bob Iger stated that at launch, Disney+ would focus on family-oriented entertainment (not carrying any content rated R,  or ) and that Hulu would continue to host general entertainment; Hulu also hosts Disney+ as an add-on service. Content intended for mature audiences (R and TV-MA) was later added to the service, including the Disney+ original The Beatles: Get Back (2021), which includes a content warning, and the Marvel series produced for Netflix, all of which are rated TV-MA. With the addition of the Marvel Netflix series in March 2022, revised parental controls were introduced to the service in the United States to allow the more mature content of the series to be added, similarly to the controls that already exist for other regions that have the Star content hub.

Content library 
It is suggested that Disney+ had approximately 7,000 television episodes and 500 films at launch, including original television series and films from Disney Channel, National Geographic and Freeform, as well as select titles from 20th Television, 20th Television Animation and ABC Signature. New releases from 20th Century Studios (such as Blue Sky Studios' Spies in Disguise and a load of live-action films) may not immediately be available on either Disney+ or Hulu, as the studio has pre-existing output deals with other premium TV/streaming providers (including HBO in the U.S. until 2022, Crave in Canada and Sky in the UK, Ireland, Italy and Germany). Captain Marvel, Dumbo (2019), and Avengers: Endgame became the first theatrically released Disney films to stream exclusively on Disney+ within the pay-cable window.

It was announced that Disney+ would add the first 30 seasons of The Simpsons to the service at launch, as the series' new exclusive home, with season 31 being added on October 2, 2020, season 32 being added on September 29, 2021, and season 33 being added on October 5, 2022, in the United States.

Iger said that Disney+ will eventually host the entire Disney film library, including all of the films that are currently in the "Disney Vault". However, he stated that the controversial Song of the South (1946), which has never been released on home video in its entirety in the U.S., will never be released on the service. Walt Disney Animation Studios' 1946 film Make Mine Music is not available on the service, possibly due to a gunfight scene, making it the only film in the Disney animated canon not to be included. Despite being available at launch, at least five filmsHome Alone, Home Alone 2: Lost in New York, Pirates of the Caribbean: On Stranger Tides, Ice Age and Garfield: A Tail of Two Kittieshad been temporarily removed from the service in the U.S.

It was initially unclear whether the first six films of the Star Wars franchise would be available in the United States at the service's launch, as TBS held streaming rights through 2024 as part of its cable rights to the franchise, but in April 2019, it was announced that the films would be available at launch along with The Force Awakens and Rogue One, with The Last Jedi added on December 26, 2019; The Rise of Skywalker added on May 4, 2020, and Solo: A Star Wars Story was added on July 10, 2020. On April 2, 2021, several older Star Wars  were released.

In the United States, most of the films from the Marvel Cinematic Universe were available at launch, with the exception of seven films: Thor: Ragnarok (added on December 5, 2019), Black Panther (added on March 4, 2020), Avengers: Infinity War (added on June 25, 2020), and Ant-Man and the Wasp (added on August 14, 2020), due to existing licensing deals with Netflix; and The Incredible Hulk, Spider-Man: Homecoming, and Spider-Man: Far From Home, which are unavailable because their distribution rights are owned by Universal Pictures (The Incredible Hulk) and Sony Pictures through the Columbia Pictures division (Spider-Man).

Some films were modified by Disney: a post-credits scene from Toy Story 2 was edited out; nudity was eliminated from Splash by adding digital hair, blurring, and cropping certain scenes, although the original uncensored theatrical version was restored to the service in 4K in November 2022; films such as Adventures in Babysitting, Free Solo, and Hamilton are altered to remove profanities; The Adventures of Bullwhip Griffin (1967) was edited to remove racial slurs, and the short film Santa's Workshop (1932) was edited to remove a "stereotypical black doll". Some older content, such as films, animated shorts, and series, have a content disclaimer on the platform noting the possibility of outdated cultural depictions. Starting in October 2020, a 12-second content disclaimer informing viewers of racially insensitive scenes plays before some older Disney filmsincluding Peter Pan, Dumbo, Swiss Family Robinson, Lady and the Tramp, The Jungle Book, Aladdin (alongside the two direct-to-video sequels), and The Aristocats. Additionally, by January 2021, some of these films were no longer viewable on kids profiles; the titles were still available to view on regular profiles. X-Men: Days of Future Past, which was released by 20th Century Fox on May 23, 2014, contains both nudity and the word "fuck", began airing uncensored in mid-2020. Some series are missing episodes, including Darkwing Duck, The Little Mermaid, The Proud Family, Phineas and Ferb, Spider-Man and His Amazing Friends, The Muppet Show, and The Simpsons, amongst other programs. All episodes featuring Stoney Westmoreland on Andi Mack are banned from the service.

On November 22, 2021, Disney and WarnerMedia reached a deal to amend the pre-existing deal HBO had with Fox to allow Disney+ or Hulu and HBO Max to share the streaming rights to half of 20th Century Studios' and Searchlight Pictures' 2022 theatrical slate in the United States during the pay-one window, with Ron's Gone Wrong being the first film under the deal, becoming available on both Disney+ and HBO Max on December 15, 2021. Disney will still have full streaming rights to any 20th Century Studios and Searchlight Pictures films produced for Disney+ or Hulu, while the Disney deal with WarnerMedia for streaming 20th Century Studios and Searchlight Pictures films on HBO Max will end in 2022, with Disney+ and Hulu assuming the full pay-one rights to films released after 2022.

Original scripted content 
The service's initial original content goal was planned to include four to five original films and five television shows with budgets from $25–100 million. In January 2019, it was reported that Disney would spend up to $500 million in original content for the service. Original series based on Star Wars and Marvel properties have been or are being produced. Original Star Wars series include The Mandalorian and its spin-offs The Book of Boba Fett and Ahsoka, a seventh season of the animated The Clone Wars (and a spin-off series titled The Bad Batch), as well as Obi-Wan Kenobi, Andor, Skeleton Crew, The Acolyte and Lando. Original Marvel series include WandaVision and its spin-offs Agatha: Coven of Chaos and Vision Quest, The Falcon and the Winter Soldier, Loki, Hawkeye and its spin-off Echo, Moon Knight, Ms. Marvel, She-Hulk: Attorney at Law, Secret Invasion, Ironheart, Daredevil: Born Again, and Wonder Man. Animated Marvel series include What If..?, I Am Groot, X-Men '97, Spider-Man: Freshman Year, and Marvel Zombies.

In January 2019, Disney+ ordered Diary of a Future President from CBS Television Studios, its first series from an outside production company.

A television series remake of the film High Fidelity was initially announced for Disney+, but in April 2019, it was announced that the project had been moved to Hulu, citing concerns from its staff that the positioning of Disney+ as a family-friendly service was at odds with their creative vision for the series. Love, Victor, a spin-off of the film Love, Simon, was similarly shifted from Disney+ to Hulu in February 2020.

In August 2019, Iger announced that 20th Century Fox films such as Home Alone, Night at the Museum, Diary of a Wimpy Kid, and Cheaper by the Dozen will be "'reimagined' for 'a new generation'" exclusively for Disney+ by Fox Family.

Most original episodic content is released weekly, as opposed to all at once with the release time initially being 12:01 a.m. PT on Fridays, which lasted from November 15, 2019, to June 25, 2021. With the premiere of Loki, which debuted on June 9, 2021, Disney shifted the release schedule for new original series and new seasons of the respective series to Wednesdays.

On December 25, 2020, Soul became the first feature-length film from Pixar to be released as a Disney+ original. The following two Pixar films, Luca and Turning Red, were also released as Disney+ originals.

On February 1, 2022, Disney announced that Star Original Korean drama series Snowdrop would be released on Disney+ in the U.S. on February 9, 2022, as a Disney+ original; this marks the series becoming the first international content for Disney+ and the first content as both a Disney+ and Star original.

Original unscripted content 
Disney also plans original factual television content for the service, aiming to "find the ethos of Disney in everyday stories, inspiring hope and sparking the curiosity of audiences of all ages." Some of these series will have ties to Disney properties, including behind-the-scenes documentary miniseries focusing on Disney studios (such as one following the production of Frozen II), the Disney-themed competition cooking competition Be Our Chef, Cinema Relics (a documentary series showcasing iconic costume and props from Disney films), Marvel's Hero Project (a series showcasing "inspiring kids [that] have dedicated their lives to selfless acts of bravery and kindness"), and The Imagineering Story (a Leslie Iwerks-directed documentary series chronicling the history and work of Walt Disney Imagineering). National Geographic also produced Magic of the Animal Kingdom (a docuseries following the animal caretakers of Disney's Animal Kingdom and Epcot's aquarium) and The World According to Jeff Goldblum.

Disney reached a two-year pact with the documentary studio Supper Club (Brian McGinn, David Gelb and Jason Sterman, producers of Netflix's Chef's Table) to produce content for the service, including the conservation-themed nature documentary series Earthkeepers, and Marvel's 616, a documentary series chronicling the cultural and societal impact of Marvel's characters. Other factual series include Encore! (a Kristen Bell-produced series that reunites casts from high school musical productions to reprise their roles), (Re)Connect (a reality series produced by Kelly Ripa and Mark Consuelos' Milojo Productions), Rogue Trip (a travel series featuring Bob Woodruff and his son Mack), and the reality competition Shop Class.

On April 8, 2022, it was announced that Dancing with the Stars would be moving from ABC to Disney+.

Simultaneous releases

Premier Access 

The live-action adaptation of Mulan was premiered in select countries on Disney+ with Premier Access for a premium fee ($29.99) on September 4, 2020, and later was made available for free to all subscribers on December 4. A second feature film, Raya and the Last Dragon, was offered through the Premier Access model on March 5, 2021, the same day as its theatrical release, and was made available for all users on June 4. In March 2021, Disney announced that Cruella and Black Widow would be released theatrically and through Premier Access. In May 2021, Disney announced that Jungle Cruise would also be released theatrically and through Premier Access.

Network releases 
In September 2021, it was reported that Disney had begun a new television release strategy by giving episodes from certain series an early premiere on Disney+ ahead of their television debuts. The first series to be released through this strategy was The Ghost and Molly McGee, with episodes 3 to 5 being released on Disney+ on October 6, 2021. This was followed by the third and final season of Fancy Nancy premiering in its entirety on Disney+ alongside its premiere episode on Disney Junior on November 12, 2021.

In November 2021, it was reported that the Disney Channel Original Movie Christmas Again would be released on Disney+ on December 3, 2021, the same day of its television premiere, marking the first film to receive a simultaneous release.

Third-party content 
In addition to Disney's own content, select television programs produced by third-party companies but broadcast on Disney-owned television channels are also featured, such as BBC Studios' Bluey. Content co-produced with Disney's European subsidiaries, such as Zagtoon's Miraculous: Tales of Ladybug & Cat Noir and Ghostforce, eOne's PJ Masks, Zodiak Kids' The Unstoppable Yellow Yeti and Samka Studios' Vikingskool are also available on Disney+ in several territories worldwide.

In October 2022, Disney+ announced that it had acquired streaming rights, excluding the United Kingdom & Ireland (which remained to be streamed on BBC iPlayer), to the BBC series Doctor Who starting in 2023 with its upcoming fourteenth series with Ncuti Gatwa as the Fifteenth Doctor.

Multi-Year deal with Sony Pictures
In April 2021, Disney and Sony Pictures reached a multi-year deal to let Sony's titles (such as films from the Spider-Man and Jumanji franchises, and anime licensed by Funimation/Crunchyroll like Attack on Titan and Fate/stay night: Unlimited Blade Works) stream on Hulu and Disney+. A significant number of Sony titles began streaming on Hulu starting in June 2021. It includes films from 2022 onwards. While the deal only concerns the United States, titles from Sony Pictures begun to also be added to Disney+ in regions outside of the U.S., as early as June 2022, starting with the majority of the Spider-Man films.

European deals
In European territories, Disney+ contains several locally produced content in order to fulfill certain countries' local content criteria's.

In November 2021, Disney announced that StudioCanal's Paddington films would be released on Disney+ in the United Kingdom and Ireland, with the films also arriving on Germany and France eventually. Several other StudioCanal movies such as Maya the Bee are also available on the service.

Films from Pathé such as Asterix and Obelix vs. Caesar, and Chicken Run are also available on Disney+ in select European territories.

Entertainment One and Hasbro's Peppa Pig is also available on the service in many EMEA regions, first made available in March 2023.

Device support and service features 
Disney+ is available for streaming via web browsers on Windows, macOS, and Linux, as well as apps on iOS and Apple TV, Android and Android TV, Fire TV and Fire HD, Chromecast and ChromeOS devices, Samsung Smart TVs, LG webOS TVs, Vizio SmartCast TVs, Roku devices, Xfinity Flex, Sky Q, Now TV devices, PlayStation 4, PlayStation 5,  Xbox One, Xbox Series X/S, Windows 10 and Windows 11. Content available on Disney+ is also listed in the Apple TV and Google TV apps.

Accessibility features include closed captioning, audio description (also known as described video), and audio navigation assistance.

Disney+ allows seven user profiles per account, with the ability to stream on four devices concurrently and unlimited downloads for offline viewing. Content is able to be streamed in resolutions up to 4K Ultra HD in Dolby Vision and HDR10, with Dolby Atmos sound on supported devices. Legacy content and Disney+ originals are available in multiple languages. As of June 2022, the international version of the Disney+ app is translated in 21 languages (not including variants). A substantial amount of content is available in Hindi, Indonesian, Thai, Malay, Tamil, Telugu, Bengali, Malayalam, Kannada, and Marathi languages on the Indian and select Southeast Asian countries counterpart, Disney+ Hotstar. The localised Disney+ app around the MENA and South Africa features content in Arabic and Hebrew subtitles and dubbing. Many feature films and shows are available in two Arabic dub variants: Standard and Egyptian. 

In late May 2020, the service added the ability to switch between 4:3 and 16:9 aspect ratios for early Simpsons episodes, after the service received backlash for stretching those episodes to 16:9 by default at launch. Disney had done this "in order to guarantee visual quality and consistency across all 30 seasons." To accommodate the feature, Disney Streaming Services "had to reconfigure its content-delivery engine" while ensuring the new feature would not break any existing features such as continue watching, watchlists, and auto-playing, as they did not want to treat the 4:3 versions as bonus content. The resulting changes allowed Disney to apply the existing audio, subtitle information, episode artwork, and other metadata from the episodes to both aspect ratios regardless of which is chosen by the user. Joe Rice, vice president of media product at Disney Streaming Services, added that these adjustments "opens up a number of exciting opportunities for novel ways of presenting content in the future."

In September 2020, the service added the GroupWatch feature which allows up to seven different Disney+ accounts to link up and co-view programming with one another. Viewers are able to react to content with six different emojis, and control playback for the entire group. It is available on web browser, mobile app, smart TVs, and connected TV devices in the United States, and later expanded to Europe in 2020. The feature was previously tested in Australia, Canada, and New Zealand.

In November 2021, Disney and IMAX announced that 13 films from the Marvel Cinematic Universe would receive IMAX Enhanced versions on Disney+, that feature IMAX's 1.90:1 aspect ratio for scenes shot in or opened up for the format. This feature became available beginning on November 12, 2021, with the IMAX Enhanced versions also adding other features such as DTS audio at a later point, as well as all IMAX Enhanced titles still retaining other features from the standard widescreen versions, like Dolby Vision and Dolby Atmos.

Launch

Launch as a standalone Disney+ 
Disney+ was launched early in the Netherlands on September 12, 2019, as a free trial. It officially launched in the Netherlands, United States and Canada on November 12, 2019, just before 3:00 a.m. EST (UTC–5). Disney+ launched in Australia, New Zealand, and Puerto Rico on November 19, 2019, and launched in Austria, the United Kingdom, Spain, Italy, Germany, Ireland, and Switzerland on March 24, 2020. In the UK and Ireland, Disney+ replaced DisneyLife. In Spain, a linear Disney+ television channel launched alongside the streaming service. The channel is available exclusively on Movistar+, which serves as Disney+'s launch partner in the region.

In December 2019, it was announced that Canal+ would be the exclusive distributor of Disney+ in France. The launch in France was delayed from March 24 to April 7, pursuant to a request from the French government to conserve network capacity due to the COVID-19 pandemic placing additional strain on communications networks.

In April 2020, it was announced that Disney+ original content would be licensed to pay TV and streaming operator OSN, starting on April 9, in 17 countries in the Middle East and North Africa region with Disney noting that they had no current "plan to launch Disney+ as a standalone service in the region in the near future".

The service launched in Japan on June 11, 2020, as part of Disney's existing partnership with NTT Docomo, and succeeded the existing Disney Deluxe service in the region.

Few months later, Disney+ service expanded in Portugal, Belgium, Finland, Iceland, Luxembourg, Norway, Sweden, Denmark, and Greenland on September 15, 2020; and in Latin America and the Caribbean on November 17, 2020.

The service expanded to Singapore on February 23, 2021.

On August 12, 2021, Disney announced that it would launch in the Middle East and Africa in mid-2022. Following the announcement, all the Disney+ original content has been removed from OSN, which its platform were previously host Disney+ original content through licensing since April 2020.

It was announced that the service would also expand to Central and Eastern Europe, Hong Kong, Taiwan, South Korea, Israel, South Africa, and Turkey later in between 2021 and 2022. Among them, it has been confirmed that the service would launch on November 12, 2021, in South Korea and Taiwan, and on November 16, 2021, in Hong Kong. It will be available in more than 50 countries by 2022 and in more than 160 countries by the end of 2023.

On March 29, 2022, Disney announced that it would launch the service in South Africa on May 18, 2022, in the Middle East and North Africa (excluding Syria) on June 8, 2022, in most of the remaining European countries on June 14, 2022, and in Israel on June 16, 2022.

The service was also launched in the Philippines on November 17, 2022, in addition to mobile plan launch.

The Disney Bundle 
Alongside the launch of the standalone Disney+ service in the U.S., Disney also announced a bundle including its other U.S. streaming services Hulu (ad-supported version) and ESPN+, marketed as The Disney Bundle, initially for US$12.99 per month; the monthly price of this plan subsequently increased to $13.99. Additional variants of the bundle were later added including the ad-free and Live TV variants of Hulu; then, in late 2021, Disney+ and ESPN+ became non-removable parts of the Hulu + Live TV package.

In connection with the August 10, 2022, announcement of the ad-supported version of Disney+ launching on December 8, several new bundle options and increased prices were announced as taking effect the same day. Monthly prices for these plans range from $9.99 (for Disney Bundle Duo Basic, a new bundle with ad-supported versions of Disney+ and Hulu, but not ESPN+) to $82.99 (for Hulu + Live TV with the ad-free versions of Disney+ and Hulu streaming content, as well as ESPN+, which is only offered as an ad-supported service). The monthly price of the original bundle with ad-free Disney+, ad-supported Hulu, and ESPN+ increased to $14.99; however, that plan only remains available to existing subscribers.

Bundled options are also offered in Latin America incorporating Disney+ and Star+, as well as Lionsgate's streaming service Lionsgate+ (formerly Starzplay) in some countries of Latin America. In Brazil, there is also a bundle of Disney+ and Globoplay offered on Globoplay's website.

Launch as Disney+ Hotstar 

In February 2020, Iger announced that it planned to launch Disney+ in India on March 29, 2020, by means of its existing service Hotstar, rebranding its paid tiers as a co-branded service. Hotstar was acquired by Disney during the Fox purchase, and has been the dominant streaming service in the country. However, it was postponed due to the Indian Premier League being rescheduled due to the COVID-19 pandemic. It was then launched on April 3, 2020. A few months later, Disney+ launched in Indonesia through Hotstar on September 5, 2020.

On February 25, 2021, it was reported that Disney+ was launched in Malaysia and Thailand through Hotstar within 2021. It was later confirmed that the launch would take place in Malaysia on June 1, 2021, and Thailand on June 30, 2021. Later on, there was a report stating the service is expected to launch in Vietnam in 2022, but due to numerous delays on the launch as most of its content is being added, the exact date remains unknown.

The Disney+ service officially launched in the 17 MENA markets, including Israel, in June 2022. Although not branded as Hotstar, a variant of the Disney+ Hotstar app for non-PC devices was made available for these markets. It has the same user interface and login system as Hotstar but does not support the Disney ID SSO like the international version of the Disney+ app does. In fact, users in the MENA markets are met with an error message upon booting the international version of the Disney+ app, and MENA subscribers cannot access their accounts outside the region, and vice versa. This variant is also available for South Africa and the Philippines.

Star content hub launch 

Star, Its brand for general entertainment content launched on February 23, 2021, in Canada, Europe, Australia, New Zealand, and Singapore. Star was added to Disney+ in Japan on October 27, 2021, and launched along with the service in South Korea and Taiwan on November 12 and Hong Kong on November 16 that year. Star was later introduced in South Africa, MENA and Eastern Europe in summer of 2022. Disney+ in Turkey and Greece will not be carrying the Star brand due to local channels having the name, it is called "More Entertainment", instead. It is also available in the Philippines since November 17, 2022.

Reception 

On November 13, 2019, a day after its launch, Disney announced that the streaming service had already signed up more than 10 million subscribers. Disney+ has been well-received, thanks to its affordable price and for the extensive Disney library. Frank Pallotta of CNN stated that "the company [Disney] has repackaged its trove of beloved content for the service makes it a worthy companion to the other services in the marketplace. Nick Pino of TechRadar stated, "If Disney keeps it updated with new content, Disney+ could rival Netflix sooner rather than later."

Upon launch, Disney+ experienced significant technical difficulties. Users complained about receiving error messages that the service was down and that they were "unable to connect", which were irritating because many of them had paid for the service months in advance. In some instances, passwords needed to be reset to enable access.

One other negative aspect with the launch of the service was the presentation of the non-HD episodes of The Simpsons. Namely, that instead of presenting them in their original aspect ratio, they were either cropped to fit 16:9 widescreen televisions or awkwardly stretched out to that aspect ratio. FXX's now-defunct "Simpsons World" streaming service was similarly criticized when it launched. In response, Disney stated they would make the ability to watch the episodes of the first 19 seasons and some from season 20 in either the 4:3 or 16:9 aspect ratio in early 2020. The feature was made available on May 28, 2020.

Some have noted that episodes of The Simpsons, X-Men, DuckTales, Phineas and Ferb, Kim Possible, and The Avengers: Earth's Mightiest Heroes are presented almost entirely out of order, while some series are missing episodes. Others have questioned why an extensive catalog of Disney-owned material is missing from the platform, including older Disney-produced films, Disney Junior titles, Marvel content, some Muppets media, and the unreleased Star Wars animated comedy series Star Wars Detours. On June 26, 2020, the 2017 DuckTales series had its episodes arranged in the proper order while co-creator of Phineas and Ferb, Jeff "Swampy" Marsh, has stated that they are working on correcting the order of his series.

Disney+ was the top trending Google search term in 2019 in the US. In February 2020, Disney reported that Disney+ had 26.5 million subscribers by the end of 2019, and 28.6 million by February 3, 2020. By April 2020, Disney+ had 50 million paid subscribers, with approximately 8 million of those coming from India. The service had 54.5 million subscribers by May 4, 57.5 million subscribers by the end of June, 60.5 million subscribers by August 4, 73.7 million subscribers by September 30, and 86.8 million subscribers as of December 2. In February 2021, Disney reported that Disney+ had 94.9 million subscribers as of January 2, 2021. On March 9, 2021, Disney reported that the service had surpassed 100 million paid subscribers but did not say when it had hit the milestone. The company clarified that it would now only be providing subscriber number updates when certain milestones are reached, as opposed to releasing exact numbers each quarter.

In 2020, Apple Inc. named Disney+ the Apple TV App of the Year. It was the second and third most-downloaded free app of the year globally on the iPad and iPhone, respectively. It was also voted the best app of 2020 by Google Play users. In H1 of 2021, the app reached 125 million downloads.

See also 
 Disney+ Day

Notes

References

External links 
 

 
2019 in film
2019 in television
2019 introductions
Internet properties established in 2019
Internet television streaming services
2019 establishments in the United States
Subscription video on demand services
PlayStation 4 software
PlayStation 5 software
IOS software
Xbox One software
Xbox Series X and Series S software
Android (operating system) software